Nipponocypris sieboldii is a species of cyprinid in the genus Nipponocypris that is endemic to Japan.

References

Cyprinidae
Cyprinid fish of Asia
Fish of Japan
Taxa named by Coenraad Jacob Temminck
Taxa named by Hermann Schlegel
Fish described in 1846